Introducing Lee Morgan is an album by jazz trumpeter Lee Morgan with Hank Mobley's quintet released on the Savoy label.  It was recorded on November 5 and 7, 1956, and features performances by Morgan with Hank Mobley, Hank Jones, Doug Watkins and Art Taylor.

Reception
The Allmusic review by Scott Yanow stated: "At the time Morgan (who was just 17) was very much under the musical influence of Clifford Brown although a bit of his own personality was starting to shine through".

Track listing 
 "Hank's Shout" (Mobley) - 7:03
 "Nostalgia" (Navarro) - 8:53
 "Bet" (Watkins) - 7:56
 "Softly, As in a Morning Sunrise" (Hammerstein, Romberg) - 2:29
 "P.S. I Love You" (Jenkins, Mercer) - 4:22
 "Easy Living" (Rainger, Robin) - 2:49
 "That's All" (Alan Brandt, Haymes) - 2:43

Recorded on November 5 (1, 3-7) and 7 (#2), 1956.

Personnel 
 Lee Morgan - trumpet
 Hank Mobley - tenor saxophone
 Hank Jones - piano
 Doug Watkins - bass
 Art Taylor - drums

References

Hard bop albums
Lee Morgan albums
1956 albums
Savoy Records albums
Albums recorded at Van Gelder Studio